Mathias De Wolf (born 21 February 2002) is a Belgian professional footballer who plays as a central midfielder or attacking midfielder for Eredivisie club NEC Nijmegen.

Career
De Wolf signed for NEC Nijmegen on a three-year contract from Club Brugge in July 2020.

References

External links
 

Living people
2002 births
Belgian footballers
Footballers from Flemish Brabant
Association football midfielders
Club Brugge KV players
NEC Nijmegen players
Eredivisie players
Eerste Divisie players
Belgian expatriate footballers
Expatriate footballers in the Netherlands
Belgian expatriate sportspeople in the Netherlands
Belgium youth international footballers
Sportspeople from Leuven
Belgian people of Cuban descent